Octavius Evans Winslow (10 September 1850 – 13 October 1896) was an English cricketer.  Winslow was a right-handed batsman who bowled right-arm roundarm medium.  He was born at Leamington Spa, Warwickshire.

Winslow made his first-class debut for Sussex against Surrey in 1869.  He made four further first-class appearances in that season, the last of which came against Surrey.  In his only season of first-class cricket, he scored 207 runs at an average of 20.70, with a high score of 56.  This score was the only fifty he made and came against Kent.

He died at Bermondsey, London on 13 October 1896.

References

External links
Octavius Winslow at ESPNcricinfo
Octavius Winslow at CricketArchive

1850 births
1896 deaths
Sportspeople from Leamington Spa
English cricketers
Sussex cricketers